Andrea di Cione di Arcangelo (c. 1308 – 25 August 1368), better known as Orcagna, was an Italian painter, sculptor, and architect active in Florence. He worked as a consultant at the Florence Cathedral and supervised the construction of the façade at the Orvieto Cathedral. His Strozzi Altarpiece (1354–57) is noted as defining a new role for Christ as a source of Catholic doctrine and papal authority.

Works
Orcagna's works include:

  "Altarpiece of the Redeemer" (1354–57) in the Strozzi di Mantova Chapel at Santa Maria Novella, Florence
 The tabernacle in Orsanmichele (finished 1359) which was regarded as "the most perfect work of its kind in Italian Gothic".
 His fresco The Triumph of Death inspired Franz Liszt's masterwork Totentanz. 
 His fresco Crucifixion with a multitude of angels surrounding the cross, portrayed on a dark background and a few fragments of the Last Supper (1365).

The mosaic decoration and the rose window of the cathedral of Orvieto is attributed to Orcagna, who had become Master of the Works in 1359.

Pupils
Among Orcagna's pupils and legacy were:
Nello di Vanni, a Pisan painter of the 14th century, who also worked for the Campo Santo. Nello di Vanni is conjectured to be identical with Bernardo Nello or Giovanni Falcone.
Tommaso del Mazza, called Tomasso di Marco by Giorgio Vasari
Jacopo di Cione, brother of Andrea and mainly sculptor and architect

References

External links

Gothic painters
Trecento painters
1308 births
1368 deaths
Painters from Florence
Painters from Tuscany
Architects from Florence
14th-century people of the Republic of Florence
14th-century Italian architects
14th-century Italian painters
Italian male painters
Sibling artists